Smashing Magazine is an online magazine dedicated to web developers and web designers around the world. It was founded in 2006 by Sven Lennartz (co-founder) and Vitaly Friedman (editor-in-chief) as part of the German-based Smashing Media AG. Since 2012, it also runs web design conferences in Europe and North America, known as SmashingConf (founded by Vitaly Friedman and Marc Thiele). 

Smashing Magazine is one of the most active and largest publishers of web development resources. The Huffington Post has ranked Smashing Magazine as one of the best places for web developers to find jobs.

Content 
Articles

Smashing magazine has over three million page views per month, and claims to be one of the world's most popular and highly regarded magazines in the area of web design and web development. Topics include web design, graphic design, and user experience. The content is primarily targeted toward advanced web design and development professionals.

Conferences

Smashing Magazine hosts four annual conferences, founded in 2012 by Marc Thiele and Vitaly Friedmann, that take place in New York City, San Francisco, Barcelona, and Freiburg. Each conference consists of two-day, single-track talks and workshops featuring prominent members of the industry discussing web design trends and insights. Notable speakers include Stefan Sagmeister, Jon Burgerman, Peter Sunde, and Daniel Burka.

Library

On November 27, 2012, Smashing Magazine started their Smashing Library, containing more than 60 eBooks and videos on web design. The bundle provides new, curated content on design best practices and coding techniques, as well as access to the publication's most recent back-catalogue. The eBooks are available in PDF, ePUB, and Amazon Kindle.

Newsletter

Highlights of the magazine are collated bi-monthly to form an email newsletter. As of August 2022, the newsletter has over 176,000 subscribers.

Awards and recognition 
In 2010, Smashing Magazine was the recipient of a Shorty Award for its notable contribution to the field of design. It also was the winner of the .net Awards in 2008 in the category "Best Blog".

References

External links
 Official website
 Smashing Library
 Smashing Conference
 Smashing Newsletter

Technology websites
Internet properties established in 2006
German news websites
Shorty Award winners